The 79th Oregon Legislative Assembly was the meeting of the Oregon Legislative Assembly from January 9, 2017 until May 21, 2018.

In the November 2016 elections, the Democratic Party of Oregon lost one seat in the Senate leaving a 17–13 majority and maintaining its 35–25 control of the House.

Senate 
Based on the results of the 2016 elections, the Oregon State Senate is composed of 17 Democrats and 13 Republicans. Republicans gained one seat in District 3.

Senate members

Senate President: Peter Courtney (D–11 Salem)
President Pro Tempore: Laurie Monnes Anderson (D–25 Gresham)
Majority Leader: Ginny Burdick (D–18 Portland)
Minority Leader: Ted Ferrioli (R–30 John Day) until November 2017; Jackie Winters (R-10 Salem) after November 2017

House members

Based on the results of the 2016 elections, the Oregon House of Representatives is composed of 35 Democrats and 25 Republicans. Neither party made any net gains.

Speaker: Tina Kotek (D–44 Portland)
Speaker Pro Tempore: Paul Holvey (D-8 Eugene)
Majority Leader: Jennifer Williamson (D–36 Portland)
Minority Leader: Mike McLane (R–55 Powell Butte)

See also
 Oregon legislative elections, 2016

References

External links 
 Chronology of regular legislative sessions from the Oregon Blue Book
 Chronology of special legislative sessions from the Blue Book

2017 in Oregon
2018 in Oregon
Oregon legislative sessions
2017 U.S. legislative sessions
2018 U.S. legislative sessions